Os 24 Maiores Sucessos da Era do Rock! (The Age of Rock's 24 Greatest Hits) is an album of late 1950s and early 1960s era rock and roll and Jovem Guarda songs covered by the Brazilian singer and guitarist Raul Seixas. The album's 1975 pressing (the first to actually credit Seixas) was retitled 20 Anos de Rock (20 years of rock).

History 
Seixas maintained that the real rock 'n' roll was finished in 1959, with the departure of Elvis Presley into the army. In 1973, he decided to honor what he felt was the "real rock" and offered to rewrite a selection of hits of the genre, shared between American classics from Little Richard, Carl Perkins, Ronnie Self, The Platters, Neil Sedaka, and Brazilians such as Eduardo Araujo, Celly Campello, Roberto Carlos and Erasmo Carlos.

Seixas was, however, forbidden by the record company to put his name on the cover, because it thought that the album could hurt sales of Krig-Há, Bandolo!. The solution was to credit the album to a band called Rock Generation, with Seixas credited as production director. The album did not have any kind of exposure and ended up being forgotten in stores initially, but with albums Krig-Há, Bandolo! and Gita having achieved great sales figures, the label Phonogram eventually released what it thought were the best tracks from the album.

Track listing (LP)

Side one 
 "Rock Around the Clock" (Jimmy de Knight; Max C. Freedman)
 "Blue Suede Shoes" (Carl Perkins)
 "Tutti Frutti" (Little Richard Penniman; Joe Lubin; Dorothy La Bostrie)
 "Long Tall Sally" (Little Richard Penniman; Enotris Johnson; Robert Blackwell)
 "Rua Augusta" (Hervé Cordovil)
 "O Bom" (Carlos Imperial)
 "Poor Little Fool" (Sharon Sheeley)
 "Bernardine" (Johnny Mercer)
 "Estúpido Cupido (Stupid Cupid)" (Neil Sedaka; Howard Greenfield - version: Fred Jorge)
 "Banho De Lua (Tintarella Di Luna)" (Bruno de Filippi; Francesco "Franco" Migliacci - version: Fred Jorge)
 "Lacinhos Cor-de-rosa (Pink Shoes Laces)" (Mickie Grant - version: Fred Jorge)
 "The Great Pretender" (Buck Ram)

Side two 
 "Diana" (Paul Anka)
 "Little Darling" (Maurice Williams)
 "Oh! Carol" (Neil Sedaka; Howard Greenfield)
 "Runaway" (Del Shannon; Max Crook)
 "Marcianita" (José I. Marcone; Galvarino V. Alderete - version: Fernando César)
 "É Proibido Fumar" (Roberto Carlos; Erasmo Carlos)
 "Pega Ladrão" (Getúlio F. Côrtes)
 "Jambalaya" (Hank Williams)
 "Shake, Rattle and Roll" (Charles E. Calhoun)
 "Bop-a-Lena" (Mel Tillis; Webb Pierce)
 "Only You (And You Alone)" (Ande Rand; Buck Ram)
 "Vem Quente Que Eu Estou Fervendo" (Carlos Imperial; Eduardo Araújo)

Track listing (CD) 
 "Abertura" – 0:40
 "Rock Around The Clock / Blue Suede Shoes / Tutti Frutti / Long Tall Sally" – 4:10
 "Rua Augusta / O Bom" – 2:55
 "Poor Little Fool / Bernardine" – 2:23
 "Estúpido Cupido / Banho De Lua / Lacinhos Cor-de-Rosa" – 3:51
 "The Great Pretender" – 1:44
 "Diana / Little Darlin' / Oh! Carol / Runaway" – 3:32
 "Marcianita / É Proíbido Fumar / Pega Ladrão" – 3:43
 "Jambalaya / Shake, Rattle And Roll / Bop-a-Lena" – 3:25
 "Only You" – 2:47
 "Vem Quente Que Eu Estou Fervendo" – 2:21

Credits 
Production direction: Raul Seixas and Nelson Motta
Studio direction: Raul Seixas
Recording technicians: Ari, João and Luigi
Arrangements: Raul Seixas
Orchestra conductor: Chiquinho de Moraes
Cutting: Joaquim Figueira
Mixing: Mazola
Front cover artwork: Nilo Jorge
Back cover artwork: Adalgisa Rios
Recorded 1973 at Phonogram Studios.

References 

All information gathered from back cover of vinyl edition released by Polyfar/Phonogram - Medium Series under catalog number 2494.509.

1973 albums
Raul Seixas albums
Rockabilly albums
Covers albums